Double Dare is a 2004 documentary film about stuntwomen, specifically Jeannie Epper and Zoë Bell, directed by Amanda Micheli. The documentary follows Epper and Bell over several years, Epper from 1997 and Bell from the end of Xena: Warrior Princess in 2001, to 2003.

Synopsis
The film begins with Bell finishing her work on Xena and Epper searching for continuing work in Hollywood despite her age, even considering liposuction before forgoing cosmetic surgery. Xena ends its run and Bell struggles with what to do next in her career. Meanwhile, Epper negotiates to have a women's category included in the Taurus World Stunt Awards (also called the World Stunt Awards). Bell is invited to the United States for a Xena convention. There she meets Epper and, obtaining a ticket with the help of the documentary crew, attends the stunt awards. Though initially receiving an offer to work on a series starring Victoria Pratt, Bell ultimately does not get the job and returns home to New Zealand.

The film resumes one year later with Bell still training, though unemployed, and planning a move to America. She stays with Epper, who is attempting to get a job working on 2 Fast 2 Furious with Terry Leonard. Epper helps Bell assemble the necessary elements for her to start her career in America, such as a CV and head shots. She also warns Bell about the deceptive nature of Hollywood, instructing her to list her weight as 130 lbs when Bell actually judges herself to weigh 145. Epper takes her to a training session, where they encounter Quentin Tarantino's stunt scout Kenny Lesco, who is looking for someone to double Uma Thurman in Kill Bill. Lesco arranges for an audition on the same day as the training session. Epper and Bell drive to Tarantino's Culver City training center for the audition, there meeting Tarantino himself as he evaluates Bell. Much to her delight, she earns the job doubling Thurman and is sent to train in Beijing with Yuen Wo Ping.

Eventually Bell begins filming for Kill Bill Vol. 1; the documentary shows her working on the fight between Beatrix Kiddo (Thurman) and O-Ren Ishii (Lucy Liu) and her bodyguards, as well as several other fight scenes. The film ends with Epper being honored by the Stuntmen's Association and Bell speaking optimistically about her future as an adult.

Cast
 Jeannie Epper as herself
 Zoë Bell as herself (credited as Zoe Bell)
 Lynda Carter as herself
 Lucy Lawless as herself
 Eurlyne Epper as herself
 Ken Howard as himself
 Terry Leonard as himself
 Quentin Tarantino as himself
 Steven Spielberg as himself
 May Boss as herself
 Terry Frick as himself
 Conrad E. Palmisano as himself

Awards
 AFI Audience Award - Best Documentary - 2003
 San Francisco International Film Festival - Audience Award
 Woodstock Film Festival - Best Documentary and Best Editing
 Independent Film Festival of Boston - Jury and Audience Award
 Sonoma Valley Film Festival - Audience Award

References

External links

 DoubleDareTheMovie.com
 
 
 
 

2004 films
2004 documentary films
American documentary films
Documentary films about Hollywood, Los Angeles
Documentary films about women in film
Films about stunt performers
History of women in California
2000s English-language films
Films directed by Amanda Micheli
2000s American films